Bhandaria is a village in  Gujarat, western India.

History 
Bhandaria was a single village

Village 
Modern Bhandaria, in Bhavnagar Taluka of Bhavnagar district, is situated on Maleshri or Maleshvari river.

Places of interest 
Bhandaria is known for its stone, a kind of laterite. A very fine bridge of this stone has been built across the Maleshvari river at Bhandaria itself, which is on the high road from Bhavnagar to Mahuva.

The neighbouring hills, a branch of the Khokhara range, are called the Malnath hills, after a temple which lies in one of their gorges, and which is called the Malnath Mahadev. This temple has a fine kund or reservoir of water close to it. The names of the principal hills near Bhandaria are the Kalvira, the Rojmal, the Bhinmal, the Kan-phata, and the Kurma.

References

External links and Sources 
 Imperial Gazetteer on DSAL.UChicago.edu

 This article incorporates text from a publication now in the public domain: 

Villages in Bhavnagar district